Leľa is a village and municipality in the Nové Zámky District in the Nitra Region of south-west Slovakia.

History
In historical records the village was first mentioned in 1262.

Geography
The village lies at an altitude of 124 metres and covers an area of 8.24 km². It has a population of about 400 people.

Ethnicity
The population is about 87% Hungarian and 12% Slovak.

Facilities
The village has a public library and a football pitch.

External links
https://web.archive.org/web/20061230185723/http://www.statistics.sk/mosmis/eng/run.html
Leľa – Nové Zámky Okolie

Villages and municipalities in Nové Zámky District